Elephantidae is a family of large, herbivorous proboscidean mammals collectively called elephants and mammoths. These are terrestrial large mammals with a snout modified into a trunk and teeth modified into tusks. Most genera and species in the family are extinct. Only two genera, Loxodonta (African elephants) and Elephas (Asian  elephants), are living.

The family was first described by John Edward Gray in 1821, and later assigned to taxonomic ranks within the order Proboscidea. Elephantidae has been revised by various authors to include or exclude other extinct proboscidean genera.

Classification

Scientific classification of Elephantidae taxa embraces an extensive record of fossil specimens, over millions of years, some of which existed until the end of the last ice age. Some species were extirpated more recently. The discovery of new specimens and proposed cladistics have resulted in systematic revisions of the family and related proboscideans.

Elephantids are classified informally as the elephant family, or in a paleobiological context as elephants and mammoths. The common name elephant primarily refers to the living taxa, the modern elephants, but may also refer to a variety of extinct species, both within this family and in others. Other members of the Elephantidae, especially members of the genus Mammuthus, are commonly called mammoths.

The family diverged from a common ancestor of the mastodons of Mammutidae. The classification of proboscideans is unstable and has been frequently revised.

The following cladogram shows the placement of the genus Mammuthus among other proboscideans, based on a 2007 study of hyoid characteristics:

However, a 2017 study of mitochondrial and nuclear DNA placed Palaeoloxodon as more closely related to Loxodonta (in particular, the African forest elephant)  than to Elephantina.

The systematics of the living subspecies and species of the modern elephants has undergone several revisions. A list of the extant Elephantidae includes:

Elephantidae
Loxodonta (African)
L. africana African bush elephant
L. cyclotis African forest elephant
Elephas (Asiatic)
E. maximus Asian elephant
E. m. maximus Sri Lankan elephant
E. m. indicus Indian elephant
E. m. sumatranus Sumatran elephant
E. m. borneensis Borneo elephant

Extinct species
Elephantidae
†Stegotetrabelodon
S. syrticus
S. orbus
S. lybicus
S. emiratus
Subfamily Elephantinae
†Primelephas
P. gomphotheroides
P. korotorensis
Elephas
†E.beyeri
†E. celebensis
†E. ekorensis
†E. hysudricus
†E. hysudrindicus
†E. iolensis
†El. platycephalus
Loxodonta
†L. adaurora
†L. atlantica
†L. exoptata
†L. cookei
†Palaeoloxodon
P. recki
P. antiquus
P. namadicus
P. naumanni
P. creutzburgi
P. xylophagou
P. cypriotes
P. lomolinoi
P. tiliensis
P. mnaidriensis
P. falconeri
†Mammuthus
M. africanavus
M. columbi
M. creticus
M. exilis
M. lamarmorai
M. meridionalis
M. primigenius
M. rumanus
M. subplanifrons
M. trogontherii
Possibly †Stegodibelodon
St. schneideri

Evolutionary history

Although the fossil evidence is uncertain, by comparing genes, scientists have discovered evidence that elephantids and other proboscideans share a distant ancestry with Sirenia (sea cows) and Hyracoidea (hyraxes). 
These have been assigned, along with the extinct demostylians and embrithopods, to the clade Paenungulata. In the distant past, members of the various hyrax families grew to large sizes, and the common ancestor of all three modern families is thought to have been some kind of amphibious hyracoid. One hypothesis is that these animals spent most of their time under water, using their trunks like snorkels for breathing.

In the past, a much wider variety of genera and species was found, including the mammoths and stegodons.

See also

 Deinotherium
 Embrithopoda
 Eritherium azzouzorum
 Zygolophodon
 Palaeoloxodon namadicus

References

External links
 
 

 
Extant Pliocene first appearances
Mammal families
Proboscideans
Taxa named by John Edward Gray
Elephants